Chase Mattioli (born October 6, 1989) is an American professional stock car racing driver. A member of the Mattioli family, who own Pocono Raceway, he raced in the NASCAR Nationwide Series (now Xfinity), the NASCAR Camping World Truck Series, the ARCA Racing Series, and the East Series.

Racing career

Mattioli's family has been involved in racing for 50 years, but Chase is the first to drive a racecar.

Motorsports career results

NASCAR
(key) (Bold – Pole position awarded by qualifying time. Italics – Pole position earned by points standings or practice time. * – Most laps led.)

Nationwide Series

Camping World Truck Series

Camping World East Series

ARCA Racing Series
(key) (Bold – Pole position awarded by qualifying time. Italics – Pole position earned by points standings or practice time. * – Most laps led.)

References

External links
 

1989 births
NASCAR drivers
Living people
Racing drivers from Pennsylvania
People from Monroe County, Pennsylvania
ARCA Menards Series drivers